Henry Scott may refer to:
 Henry Scott, 1st Earl of Deloraine (1676–1730), Scottish peer and army officer
 Henry Scott, 3rd Duke of Buccleuch (1746–1812), Scottish peer
 Henry Scott (Mayor of Adelaide) (1836–1913), mayor from 1877 to 1878 and Legislative Council member from 1874 to 1891
 Henry Scott (English cricketer) (1851–1941), cricketer in the 1880s
 Henry Milne Scott (1876–1956), Fijian lawyer, businessman, politician and cricketer
 Tup Scott (Henry James Herbert Scott, 1858–1910), Australian cricketer
 Sir Henry Harold Scott (1874–1956), British pathologist and expert on tropical medicine
 Henry Lawrence Scott, British Indian Army officer
 Henry P. Scott, politician and public official in Mississippi
 Henry Young Darracott Scott, Royal Engineers officer
 Henry W. Scott, American judge
 Louis Scott (runner, born 1889) (Henry Louis Scott, 1889–1954), American gold medalist at the 1912 Olympics

See also
 Harry Scott (disambiguation)